1991–92 Pirveli Liga was the 3rd season of the Georgian Pirveli Liga. The Pirveli Liga is the second division of Georgian Football. It consists of reserve teams and professional teams.

League standings

See also
1991–92 Umaglesi Liga
1991–92 Georgian Cup

Erovnuli Liga 2 seasons
2
Georgia